Boris Bushmelev (22 May 1937, Moscow – 21 December 2020) was a Soviet and Russian film director, comedian, and artist.

References

1937 deaths
2020 deaths
Russian film directors